Sir Robert Hyde (born c. 1578? – after 1638) was an English politician who sat in the House of Commons between 1621 and 1626.

Hyde was second son of William Hyde of South Denchworth in Berkshire (now Oxfordshire) and his wife Catherine daughter of George Gill of Wyddial in Hertfordshire. He was the brother of Sir George Hyde and lived at Charlton in Berkshire (now Oxfordshire). He was knighted on 23 July 1603 at the coronation of James I.

In 1621, Hyde was elected Member of Parliament for Abingdon. He was elected MP for Wootton Bassett in 1625 and Cricklade in 1626.

He married Joan, the daughter of Stephen Brice of Witney, Oxfordshire and the widow of Richard Ashcombe of Curbridge, Oxfordshire. They had no children. In 1638 he gave his age as 60 and said he had been confined in the Fleet Prison for debt.

A Robert Hyde (born c. 1595) matriculated at Magdalen Hall, Oxford, on 9 March 1610, aged 15, and was assumed by Alumni Oxonienses to be the same person; however, the History of Parliament does not make this connection.

References

1570s births
Year of death missing
People from Vale of White Horse (district)
Alumni of Magdalen College, Oxford
Robert
English MPs 1621–1622
English MPs 1625
Members of the Parliament of England (pre-1707) for Abingdon
Members of the Parliament of England (pre-1707) for Cricklade
Members of the Parliament of England (pre-1707) for Wootton Bassett